Ganghwa County is a county in  the city of Incheon, South Korea. The county is composed of Ganghwa Island, and the minor islands around it.

History
Ganghwa County contains some of the most important historical sites in Korea. These sites cover the prehistoric  old and new stone ages, as well as the bronze and iron ages. Additionally there are numerous historic sites.

Ganghwa Island is rich in dolmen, and they have been designated a World Heritage Site.  There are about 150 dolmen on the island. Their distribution shows that these dolmen were closely related to fishing in the Bronze Age, although they are now separated from the sea.  They are located on the slopes of mountains and are thus higher in elevation than their counterparts.  It is believed, but not proved, that the Ganghwa dolmen are the earliest Korean ones made, because the designs of the dolmen in Bugeun-ri and Gocheon-ri are resemble those in Ganghwa.

Dangun, the founder of Gojoseon, is said to have made an altar on top of Mani-san and offered sacrifices to his ancestors.

In the 9th century, the Unified Silla established a garrison on the island to combat piracy. Their commander, Wang Geon, established his military reputation at the garrison, and later went on to found the Kingdom of Goryeo. In the 13th century, the court of Goryeo took refuge on the island as Mongol forces invaded in 1232. After Goryeo capitulated to the Mongols, the elite forces on the island rose up, beginning the Sambyeolcho Rebellion.

In the early 19th century, Catholicism was introduced into Korea despite its official proscription by the Korean court. The Korean court clamped down on the illicit French missionaries, massacring French Catholic missionaries and Korean converts alike leading to a punitive French expedition to Korea in 1866. The encounter lasted nearly six weeks. In the first battle, a Korean infantry division lost heavily, and Korean General Yang Heon-su concluded that only a large cavalry division could stand up to French firepower. On 9 November, the French were checked when they attempted to occupy the strategically important Cheondeung (Jeongdeung–sa) Temple, on the island's south coast. Stiff Korean resistance, coupled by the overwhelming numerical superiority of the Korean defenders, now numbering 10,000 men, forced a French retreat with dozens of casualties but no deaths, finally resulting in the French retreating, and abandoning the island.

In 1871, following the General Sherman Incident, the United States Navy launched an expedition against the soldiers at Ganghwa Island, resulting in the Battle of Ganghwa.

In 1875, the Japanese ship, Unyo, made and incursion into the restricted coastal zone, under the guise of measuring the coastline. It fired a few shots at the fortress on the island. When the Unyo sent a boat to the island, the Korean garrison fired a few shots back. The Japanese argued that this was an aggressive act, and demanded concessions. Early in the following year, Japan sent a large Imperial Japanese Navy fleet to Korea, which forced the government to sign the unequal Treaty of Ganghwa. That agreement, concluded on Ganghwa Island, officially opened Korea to Japanese external trade for the first time during the 19th century.

Ganghwa was raised to the status of a county in 1906, and incorporated into the Incheon Metropolitan City in 1995.

Climate

Speciality
About 70% of Ganghwa's citizens are engaged in farming, mainly rice. Fishery and forestry are other occupations practiced.

Hwamunseok is a well-known traditional fancy matting. Since the Goryeo dynasty (10th-14th centuries), hwamunseok has been produced and exported to China and Japan. The mats are produced in the home handicraft industry. Under an order given by the royal court of the Joseon dynasty over 100 years ago, craftsman Han Chunggyo from the white-mat producing village, Yango-ri, Haesongmyeon, Ganghwa-gun, achieved a successful product by the design of his own idea. Thereafter, various designs have been developed and manufacturing techniques have been improved.

The Ganghwa turnip is a specialty of the area. It has been cultivated since the 5th century. This is recorded in the 17th-century Dongui Bogam book of oriental medicine."

World Heritages
In Ganghwa county, dolmens are registered by UNESCO as a World Heritage Site. In three regions of South Korea including Hwasun and Gochang, Ganghwa's dolmens are famous sites to study ancient culture.

Administrative Divisions of Ganghwa-gun

Ganghwa-eup (강화읍)
Seonwon-myeon (선원면)
Bureun-myeon (불은면)
Gilsang-myeon (길상면)
Hwado-myeon (화도면)
Yangdo-myeon (양도면)
Naega-myeon (내가면)
Hajeom-myeon (하점면)
Yangsa-myeon (양사면)
Songhae-myeon (송해면)
Gyodong-myeon (교동면)
Samsan-myeon (삼산면)
Seodo-myeon (서도면)

Sister cities
 Soeda, Fukuoka

References

External links
 Ganghwa-gun homepage 

 
Counties of Incheon